Sher Yadav (born 4 December 1984) is an Indian cricketer. He made his first-class debut for Goa in the 2004–05 Ranji Trophy on 4 December 2004.

References

External links
 

1984 births
Living people
Indian cricketers
Goa cricketers
Cricketers from Goa